Danube Wings served the following destinations as of April 2011. The airline ceased operations in December 2013.

Europe
Croatia
Rijeka - Rijeka Airport [summer seasonal]
Split - Split Airport [summer seasonal]
Zadar - Zadar Airport [summer seasonal]
Italy
Rimini - Rimini Airport [summer charter]
Bologna - Bologna Airport [summer charter]
Salerno - Salerno Airport [summer charter]
Slovakia
Bratislava - M. R. Štefánik Airport (Main Base)
Košice - Košice International Airport

Terminated destinations
Belgium
Brussels
Switzerland & Germany
Basel-Mulhouse-Freiburg
France
Dole-Jura
Italy
Bologna
Catania
Crotone
Lamezia Terme
Olbia
Reggio Calabria
Ireland
Dublin
Poland
Warsaw
Slovakia
Poprad
Ukraine
Kiev
United Kingdom
Cambridge Airport
London-Luton
Manchester

References

Danube Wings